Gregory Kent Lewis (June 7, 1953 – February 17, 2020) was an American politician. He has served as a Republican member for the 113th district in the Kansas House of Representatives since 2017. On February 20, 2019, Lewis announced his resignation, effective February 22, 2019, due to a diagnosis of brain cancer. Lewis died February 17, 2020, from a glioblastoma.

References

1953 births
2020 deaths
Republican Party members of the Kansas House of Representatives
21st-century American politicians
Kansas State University alumni